Hugh or Huw Davies may refer to:

 Hugh Davies (botanist) (1739–1821), Welsh botanist and clergyman
 Hugh Emyr Davies (1878–1950), Welsh Presbyterian minister
 Hugh Morriston Davies (1879–1965), Welsh surgeon
 Hugh Sykes Davies (1909–1984), English poet and novelist
 Hugh Davies (cricketer) (1932–2017), Welsh cricketer
 Hugh Davies (composer) (1943–2005), musicologist, composer, and inventor
 Huw Llywelyn Davies (born 1945), Welsh broadcaster and rugby union commentator
 Huw Davies (rugby union) (born 1959), English rugby union player
 Huw Davies (British artist), a British filmmaker and photographer currently working as a lens media at the University of Derby 
 Hugh Davies (artist) (born 1971), Australian media arts practitioner, researcher and educator
 Huw Davies (chemist), British chemist
 Huw Davies, author of Bunny, a webcomic
 Huw Davies (actor), Welsh actor, in The Worst Journey in the World
 Hugh Davies (MP for Radnor), represented Radnor
Huge Davies (real name Hugh Davies), Welsh comedian